The Nun is a 2013 French drama film directed by Guillaume Nicloux. It is based on the 18th-century novel La Religieuse by French writer Denis Diderot. The film premiered in competition at the 63rd Berlin International Film Festival. It received two nominations at the 4th Magritte Awards, winning Best Actress for Pauline Étienne, and a nomination at the 39th César Awards. Production companies included Les Films du Worso, Belle Epoque Films and Versus Production.

Plot
Taking place in the 1760s France, a young girl named Suzanne Simonin is forced by her parents to become a nun. She learns that as an illegitimate child, she is expected to atone for her mother's sin. Her abbess treats her kindly, but when the abbess dies and another takes her place, Suzanne considers breaking her vows. Due to the maltreatment and physical abuse she undergoes, she is thrown into a world of punishment in which she suffers dehumanization. Suzanne was filled with despair and mental torment. It is not until a friend gives Suzanne some hope that she may not have to remain a nun forever and that Suzanne's punishment lifts.

Cast

 Pauline Étienne as Suzanne Simonin 
 Isabelle Huppert as Abbess Saint Eutrope
 Louise Bourgoin as Abbess Christine
 Martina Gedeck as Suzanne's mother
 Françoise Lebrun as Madame de Moni
 Agathe Bonitzer as Sister Thérèse
 Alice de Lencquesaing as Sister Ursule
 Gilles Cohen as Suzanne's father
 Marc Barbé as Father Castella
 François Négret as Maître Manouri
 Nicolas Jouhet as clergyman Sainte Marie
 Pascal Bongard as Archdeacon
 Fabrizio Rongione as Father Morante

Reception
The Hollywood Reporter  Jordan Mintzer highlighted that director Nicloux and his co-writer Beaujour breathed new life into the classic story by making the protagonist "much more of a fighting spirit" and by adding a "revised ending". He said this film was "held together by a terrific lead performance". Variety's Boyd van Hoeij certified the film was "slickly assembled" and frequently  provided a "painting-like" cinematography. Cine Vue'''s Patrick Gamble judged The Nun'' suffered from an "inability to deviate from absurdity".

Awards and nominations

See also
 Isabelle Huppert on screen and stage

References

External links
Official Press Kit
 The Nun at UniFrance films
 

2013 films
2013 drama films
Belgian drama films
French drama films
2010s French-language films
Denis Diderot
Films scored by Max Richter
Films about Catholic nuns
Films about clerical celibacy
Films about sexual repression
Films based on French novels
Films critical of the Catholic Church
Films directed by Guillaume Nicloux
Films set in the 1760s
Films set in France
Works set in monasteries
Les Films du Worso films
French-language Belgian films
2010s French films